Osman Osmani was appointed as the governor of Ghazni Province, Afghanistan in June 2008. He was succeeded by Musa Khan Ahmadzai in 2010. He was governor when Aafia Siddiqui was arrested outside his compound in Ghazni on July 17, 2008.

References

Governors of Ghazni Province
Pashtun people
Year of birth missing (living people)
Living people